Larry Lewis (born October 30, 1957) is a college football coach and former player. Previously Lewis served as the head football coach at Idaho State and as an assistant coach at Weber State, Washington State and Colorado State. Lewis also played linebacker at Boise State from 1977 through 1980 and was a member of the Broncos' national championship team in 1980.

Lewis was hired by Idaho State on November 23, 1998, to serve as their head coach after he served as an assistant for Mike Price for 18 years at both Weber State and Washington State. During his tenure as the Bengals' head coach, he led the team to an overall record of 40 wins and 49 losses (40–49) and to a co-Big Sky Conference championship in 2002. Lewis was fired from Idaho State, along with his entire staff, on November 20, 2006, after they won only two games during the season.

Head coaching record

References

1957 births
Living people
American football linebackers
Boise State Broncos football players
Colorado State Rams football coaches
Idaho State Bengals football coaches
Nevada Wolf Pack football coaches
Washington State Cougars football coaches
Weber State Wildcats football coaches
People from Vale, Oregon
Players of American football from Oregon